The Elusive Summer of '68 is a 1984 Yugoslav film directed by Goran Paskaljević.  It depicts a summer dominated by protests, as seen from the point of view of a teenage boy in Yugoslavia.

Cast

Slavko Štimac - Petar Cvetković
Danilo Stojković - Veselin Cvetković
Mira Banjac - Petar's mother
Mija Aleksić - Petar's grandfather
Ivana Mihić - Vladica Cvetković
Andrija Mrkaić - Tadija Cvetković
Sanja Vejnović - Ruženjka Hrabalova
Dragana Varagić - Jagodinka Simonović
Neda Arnerić - Olja Miranovski
Miodrag Radovanović - President of the court Micić
Branka Petrić - Leposava
Dragan Zarić - School Principal
Predrag Tasovac - Man on the beach
Branko Cvejić - Kum Spasoje

External links
 

1984 films
Yugoslav drama films
Serbian drama films
Films directed by Goran Paskaljević
1980s Serbian-language films
Films set in 1968
Films set in Serbia
Films set in Yugoslavia   
Films shot in Serbia